Mark James Folkard (born 23 January 1965) is an Australian politician. He has been a Labor member of the Western Australian Legislative Assembly since the 2017 state election, representing Burns Beach.

Folkard was a Western Australia Police Sergeant before entering politics.

Folkard has been awarded the Police Overseas Service Medal with East Timor clasp, the National Police Service Medal, the National Medal, the Australian Defence Medal, the Commissioner's Medal for Excellence, the Western Australia Police Medal, and the United Nations Medal (UNMISET).

References

1965 births
Living people
Australian Labor Party members of the Parliament of Western Australia
Members of the Western Australian Legislative Assembly
Australian police officers
21st-century Australian politicians